Ivan Borg (born 20 June 1984) is a retired Maltese track & field sprinter. He represented his country at GSSE, FISU and IAAF competitions from 2005 to 2013. At the 2006 GSSE, he was part of the Maltese 4 × 400 m team that won a silver medal.

His 10.71s 100m performance in Niort, France led the nation in 2010, and remains one of the fastest times clocked by a Maltese athlete over the distance.

He last competed in the 2013 Irish Collegiate Indoor Championships, for NUIG. Since his retirement from competition, Borg sporadically covers the sport in the media.

References

1984 births
Living people
Maltese male sprinters